PTT, an abbreviation for  (lit. Post and Telegraph Agency), is the national post and telegraph directorate of Turkey. Formerly, the organization was named . After the privatization of the telephone telecommunications service business, the directorate was renamed, keeping its acronym. It is headquartered in Ankara, and is known as TURKISH POST internationally.

History
On 23 October 1840, during the reign of Abdulmejid I, the Ottoman Ministry of Posts was established. In 1855, the first telegraph service and in 1909 the first telephone service were put into use. In the same year the name of the ministry was changed to Posta Telgraf Telefon ("Posts, Telegraph and Telephone" or PTT for short) a name which was used for 86 years. After the Turkish Republic replaced the Ottoman Empire in 1923, the ministry became a general directorate of the Republic. In 1995 the telephone and other telecommunication services were transferred to newly founded Türk Telekom (which was soon privatized). Accordingly, the directorate was renamed as "Organization of Post and Telegraph". Thus the former acronym PTT is kept.

Organization
The organization consists of
Board of Directors
Director General
4 Deputy directors general
17 departments
Provincial directorates
and some auxiliary units.

The total number of postal offices all over Turkey is about 5,000 as of 2011.

Service figures
In 2020 
Accepted post items: 493 million
Total revenue: TL 2,917 billion

Service quality
Ptt runs for the ever-growing quality and efficiency with the fully modernized technology. It owns an ISO-9000 Quality Certificate.

The international outbound mail leaves the country within max. 3 days from UPİM (Uluslararası Posta İşleme Merkezi – International Mail Processing Center at the Istanbul Airport (main hub). The most of the mail bags are transported by the state-owned Turkish Airlines (actually 340 destinations). UPİM gives the information on the items sent like the Carrier name, Flight no. and Mail bag no. the item included when the detailed info needed domestically. EDI (Electronic Data Interchange) is provided whenever available.

See also
Grand Post Office, Istanbul, built between 1905-1909
Istanbul Postal Museum, 2000 established in the Istanbul Grand Post Office building
Stamp Museum in Ankara

References

External links
Ptt International Relations Dept. (Turkish)
TURKISH POST (Ptt) from the Blog "Erkan's Post 2 Mail"
PTT Offices

Turkey
1840 establishments in the Ottoman Empire
Ministry of Transport and Infrastructure (Turkey)
Government agencies of Turkey
Philately of Turkey
Organizations based in Ankara
Turkish brands